A kimchi burger is a hamburger that includes kimchi in its preparation. Several restaurants serve kimchi burgers as part of their fare, including restaurants in South Korea, England and the United States. McDonald's restaurants in South Korea serve kimchi burgers. In addition to kimchi burgers being prepared using ground beef, they may be prepared using seafood, such as salmon. Kimchi burgers are sometimes topped with an egg, and may include additional ingredients such as mayonnaise, barbecue sauce and cilantro, among others.

History
The kimchi burger is a relatively newer, modern style of hamburger. It has been stated that Uncle Joe's Hamburger of Seoul, South Korea, was the inventor of the kimchi burger.

See also

 List of hamburgers

References

Hamburgers (food)
Kimchi dishes
Korean fusion cuisine